Aleksandr Goncharov (March 27, 1959 – June 19, 1990) was a field hockey player from the Soviet Union, who won the bronze medal with his national team at the boycotted 1980 Summer Olympics in Moscow, behind India (gold) and Spain (silver).

References

External links
 

1959 births
1990 deaths
Russian male field hockey players
Olympic field hockey players of the Soviet Union
Soviet male field hockey players
Field hockey players at the 1980 Summer Olympics
Olympic bronze medalists for the Soviet Union
Olympic medalists in field hockey
Medalists at the 1980 Summer Olympics